Kia Ora is a rural locality in the Gympie Region, Queensland, Australia.

History

Kia-Ora Provisional School opened on 18 July 1921.  It became a state school in 1927. The Kia Ora Memorial Hall was erected to honour those who served in war. It is located on the corner of Johnson and Anderleigh Roads.

In 1931, the main industries were dairying and forestry.

In the 2011 census, Kia Ora had a population of 501 people.

Heritage listings 
Kia Ora has the following heritage sites:

 2572 Anderleigh Road: Kia Ora School
 McCarthy Road: Kia Ora Methodist Church

Education 
Kia-Ora State School is a government primary (Prep-6) school for boys and girls at 2754 Anderleigh Road. In 2017, the school had an enrolment of 62 students with 4 teachers and 11 non-teaching staff (5 full-time equivalent).

References

External links 

Gympie Region
Localities in Queensland